Central pain syndrome is a neurological condition consisting of constant, moderate to severe pain due to damage to the central nervous system (CNS) which causes a sensitization of the pain system. The extent of pain and the areas affected are related to the cause of the injury.

Signs and symptoms
Pain can either be relegated to a specific part of the body or spread to the entire body. It is typically constant, and may be moderate to severe in intensity.  Those who are afflicted describe it as being stuck in a loop of pain. It is often made worse by touch, movement, emotions, barometric pressure and temperature changes, usually cold temperatures along with many other similar 'triggers'. Cold temperatures regularly make the burning pain worse in certain body parts. Burning pain is the most common sensation, but patients also report pins and needles, pressing, lacerating, aching, and extreme bursts or constant sharp or unremitting excruciating pain. Individuals may have reduced sensitivity to touch in the areas affected by the pain, as if the part is 'falling asleep'. The burning and loss of sense of touch are usually, but not always, most severe on the distant parts of the body, such as the feet or hands, spreading until it is in some cases felt from head to toe. Usually the burning pain in body parts is a result of old injuries that seem like they should have healed long ago, yet the pain lingers on and even years afterwards. For some patients with intense affliction, there often can be unremitting nausea, causing vomiting. The pain can also bring on hyperventilation. Blood pressure can rise due to the pain.

Cause 
Damage to the CNS can be caused by car accidents, limb amputations, trauma, spinal cord injury, tumors, stroke,  immune system disorders or diseases, such as multiple sclerosis, Parkinson's, Graves or Addison's disease, rheumatoid arthritis, and epilepsy. It may develop months or years after injury or damage to the CNS.

Diagnosis
A diagnosis of central pain syndrome is based upon identification of characteristic symptoms, a detailed patient history, a thorough clinical evaluation and a variety of specialized tests. Central pain syndrome is suspected in individuals who complain of pain or other abnormal sensations following injury to the central nervous system. Other conditions that cause pain may need to be excluded before a diagnosis of central pain syndrome is made.

Treatment 
Pain medications often provide some reduction of pain, but not complete relief of pain, for those affected by central pain syndrome. Tricyclic antidepressants such as nortriptyline or anticonvulsants such as neurontin (gabapentin) can be useful, but also provide incomplete relief. Lowering stress levels appears to reduce pain. For regular treatment some people prefer body length heating pads while others rely on warm baths.

Prognosis 
Central pain syndrome is not a fatal disorder, but the syndrome causes disabling chronic pain and suffering among the majority of individuals who have it.

See also
 Thalamic syndrome

References

Further reading
Canavero S, & Bonicalzi V (2007) Central pain syndrome. New York: Cambridge university press  (1st ed)  (2011) new edition

External links 

 USA National Institute of Neurological disorders and Stroke - Authoritative 4 paragraphs on central pain.

Chronic pain syndromes